6th Lancers may refer to:

 6th Lancers (India)
 6th Lancers (Pakistan)